The Kenya national cricket team toured Bangladesh in March 2006 to play a four-match series of Limited Overs Internationals (LOI) which Bangladesh won 4–0. Kenya were captained by Steve Tikolo and Bangladesh by Habibul Bashar.

ODI series

1st ODI

2nd ODI

3rd ODI

4th ODI

References

External links
 Series home at ESPN Cricinfo

2006 in Bangladeshi cricket
Kenyan cricket tours abroad
International cricket competitions in 2005–06
Bangladeshi cricket seasons from 2000–01